Dice Rules is a 1991 American stand-up comedy film starring Andrew Dice Clay and directed by Jay Dubin.

Plot
The film begins with a half-hour narrative short titled "A Day in the Life" with Andrew Dice Clay playing a fictionalized version of himself. After the short, the rest of the movie consists of footage from his shows at Madison Square Garden in New York City.

Production
Originally intended to be released by 20th Century Fox on August 31, 1990, in July of that year, Fox made the decision to indefinitely delay release of the then-unnamed Andrew Dice Clay concert film. Reportedly, executives at Fox were positioning Clay as a leading man with projects such as The Adventures of Ford Fairlane seeking to distance Clay from his "Diceman" persona. Then-Fox distribution chief Tom Sherak iterated that Clay's two-night engagement at Madison Square Garden was filmed without any definite plans for a theatrical release, and emphasized the studio's opposition to issuing pictures rated NC-17. The cancelation of the film's theatrical release by Fox was praised by the National Organization for Women, a frequent critic group of Clay's material. Clay was reportedly angered by Fox's decision not to release his concert film, voicing his regret at associating with the studio. The film was eventually picked up for distribution through Carolco Pictures for release through the company's Seven Arts label shared with New Line Cinema.  Alan Friedberg, then-chairman of Loews Theaters, refused to exhibit the film, citing Clay's material related to women, ethnic groups, homosexuals, and the disabled. Other theater chains soon followed suit including American Multi-Cinema, Famous Players, and Edwards Theatres. Cineplex Odeon, National Amusements, and United Artists Theaters agreed to showcase the film, but were considered more niche "Art House" syndicates.

Reception
Dice Rules received negative reviews with an aggregate score of 7% on Rotten Tomatoes from 14 critics. Roger Ebert said of the film: "Andrew Dice Clay comes billed as a comedian, but does not get one laugh from me in the 87 minutes of this film".

He also reviewed it with Gene Siskel, each giving it a thumbs down. Siskel put it on his list of the Ten Worst films of the year.

References

External links
 
 
 Trailer

1991 films
American documentary films
1990s English-language films
1990s American films